Thirumanur block is a revenue block of Ariyalur district of the Indian state of Tamil Nadu. This revenue block consist of 36 panchayat villages.

List of Panchayat Villages 

They are,

References 

Revenue blocks of Ariyalur district